Ati or ATI may refer to:
 Ati people, a Negrito ethnic group in the Philippines
Ati language (Philippines), the language spoken by this people group
 Ati-Atihan festival, an annual celebration held in the Philippines
Ati language (China), an unclassified Loloish language of Huaning County, Yunnan, China
 Ati, a queen of the fabled Land of Punt in Africa
 Ati, Chad, a town in Chad
 Ati, Iran, a village in Khuzestan Province, Iran
 Maha Ati, one of the nine subdivisions of Buddhist Tantra in the Nyingma school

The acronym ATI may refer to:

Academic institutions
 Auckland Technical Institute, now the Auckland University of Technology, Auckland, New Zealand
 Ohio State University Agricultural Technical Institute, known as Ohio State ATI
 An associate of the Tax Institute of Australia

Electronics and information technology
 ATI Technologies, a former Canadian semiconductor company manufacturing GPUs and chipsets
 Acronis True Image, cloning and backup software
 Allied Telesis, a telecommunications company, formerly Allied Telesyn
 Tunisian Internet Agency, also known as ATI (short for Agence tunisienne d'Internet), telecommunications company in Tunisia

Companies
 ATI Physical Therapy

Transportation
 Aero Trasporti Italiani, a defunct Italian airline (ICAO designator)
 Air Transport International, a charter cargo airline
 Artigas Airport, IATA designation

Other uses
 Above threshold ionization, a photoelectrochemical process ionizing an atom by an excessive number of photons
 Allegheny Technologies Incorporated, a specialty metals company headquartered in Dallas, Texas, USA
 Access to Insight, a Theravada Buddhist website
 Associated Television International, a production and distribution company
 Astatine monoiodide, a radioactive molecule
 Amylase/trypsin inhibitor, a substance that inhibits the enzymes amylase or trypsin (see Non-celiac gluten sensitivity)

See also

 
 
 
 TI (disambiguation)
 AT (disambiguation)
 ATIS (disambiguation)
 at1 (disambiguation)
 atl (disambiguation)